Grand Piano is a 1985 studio album by the pianist George Shearing.

This was Shearing's first album of solo piano for Concord Records, it was followed by More Grand Piano (1986).

Track listing
 "When a Woman Loves a Man" (Bernie Hanighen, Gordon Jenkins, Johnny Mercer) – 4:31
 "It Never Entered My Mind" (Lorenz Hart, Richard Rodgers) – 4:48
 "Mack the Knife" (Marc Blitzstein, Bertolt Brecht, Kurt Weill) – 4:44
 "Nobody Else But Me" (Oscar Hammerstein II, Jerome Kern) – 3:31
 "Imitations" (George Shearing, George David Weiss) – 2:43
 "Taking a Chance on Love" (Vernon Duke, Ted Fetter, John La Touche) – 2:39
 "If I Had You" (James Campbell, Reginald Connelly, Ted Shapiro) – 4:50
 "How Insensitive" (Norman Gimbel, Antonio Carlos Jobim) – 3:16
 "You'd Be So Easy to Love" (Cole Porter) – 3:50
 "While We're Young" (Billy Wilder) – 5:03

Personnel

Performance
George Shearing – piano

References

1985 albums
George Shearing albums
Albums produced by Carl Jefferson
Concord Records albums
Solo piano jazz albums